Cassida butterwecki is a species of leaf beetle, situated in the subfamily Cassidinae (tortoise beetles) and the genus Cassida. It was described as a new species in 2007 from specimens collected in Madagascar in 1990.

References

Cassidinae
Beetles of Africa
Beetles described in 2007